Trautwein is a German surname. It may refer to:

Dieter Trautwein (1928–2002), German Protestant theologian and hymnwriter
Ernst Trautwein (born 1936), German ice hockey player
Heinz Trautwein (1907–1944), German submariner and naval officer
Hope Trautwein (born 1999), American softball player
Jody Trautwein (born 1970), U.S. pastor and politician
John Trautwein (born 1962), U.S. baseball pitcher
Phil Trautwein (born 1986), U.S. football player
Theodore Charles Trautwein (1869–1955), Australian politician
Theodore Walter Trautwein (1920–2000), U.S. Judge
Ulrich Trautwein (born 1972), German psychologist
Wolfgang Trautwein (born 1961), German sports shooter

See also

German-language surnames